Carey Baptist Grammar School, commonly known as Carey, is an independent, co-educational, Baptist day school in Victoria, Australia.

The school has five campuses: Kew (ELC to Year 12), Donvale (ELC to Year 6), the Carey Sports Complex in Bulleen, the Carey Sport Complex in Kew and an outdoor education camp near Paynesville in eastern Gippsland called Carey Toonallook.

Founded in 1923, the school has a non-selective enrolment policy and currently caters for approximately 2,500 students from ELC to Year 12.

Carey is affiliated with the Junior School Heads Association of Australia (JSHAA), the Association of Heads of Independent Schools of Australia (AHISA), the Association of Independent Schools of Victoria (AISV), and has been a member of the Associated Public Schools of Victoria (APS) since 1958. The school has offered the International Baccalaureate Diploma (IB) since 1997.

History
Carey Baptist Grammar School was founded by The Reverend Leonard E. Tranter, who, at the meetings of the Baptist Union of Victoria held in May 1919, urged consideration of a Baptist secondary school for boys. The present property, with the house Urangeline, was purchased in 1922 for £14,000 and the school opened on 13 February 1923 with an enrolment of 68 boys. Urangeline House was designed in 1884 by Joseph Reed. The house was originally named 'Edzell'.

The school is named in honour of the Reverend Dr William Carey, a Baptist missionary and self-taught language scholar who carried out humanitarian work in India in the late 18th century. 

In 1962,  of land were purchased at Bulleen for sports grounds, an Outdoor Education facility was built near Paynesville in 1967 and a Junior School campus was built at Donvale in 1989 with 81 students to start off with.

In 1971, the William Carey Chapel was opened. The design was led by the chaplain of the school at the time, Alan Wright. The chapel was paid for by the 'Forward Carey' Appeal of 1960. Construction began in 1969. In 2020, the chapel was declared heritage listed by the local Boroondara Council.

The school began co-education in 1979 when girls entered Years 11 and 12. By 2011, the school achieved an even 50:50 gender split between boys and girls.

The school bought the adjoining property named Cluny. The old buildings were demolished (except for the main building, Fairview) to make room for a new grass section for the Junior School at Kew, which was opened on 6 October 2006 and is known as Cluny Green.

In 2019, the school bought the Melbourne Cricket Club’s bowling property on Barkers Road which has been renamed as the Carey Kew Sports Complex.

The school celebrated its centenary year in 2023 with various celebrations throughout the year.

Principals
There have been eight principals (formerly headmasters) since the school was founded in 1923. The current principal is Jonathan Walter, since January 2020.

Name, badge and motto
The name of the school derives from William Carey, the first Baptist missionary in India. The school badge represents the old Greek torch race, very similar to a relay race, in which a chain of runners each passed to the next a torch which had to be kept burning brightly.

The school motto is "Animo et Fide" which may be translated from Latin as "With Courage and Faith". This echoes the Bible texts from Isaiah 54:2–3 on which Carey based his sermon in 1792 when he urged Baptists to form a missionary society.

Student life

Sport

From Year 5 onwards Carey students compete in the Associated Public Schools of Victoria (APS) competition in a number of different sports. Most of the sports are played at one of the two Carey Sports Complexes at Bulleen or Kew.

The sports offered at Carey include badminton, bike fitness, cricket, futsal, rowing, softball, swimming, diving, table tennis, tennis, basketball, cross country, football, hockey, netball, soccer, water polo, athletics, and snowsports, as well as Fitness Club, yoga, football umpiring, and St John Ambulance.

APS & AGSV Premierships 
Carey has won the following APS and AGSV/APS* premierships.

Boys:

 Athletics - 1966
 Basketball (6) - 1992, 2002, 2011, 2012, 2017, 2018
 Cricket (3) - 1963, 1970, 1975
 Cross Country - 1999
 Football (2) - 1999, 2019
 Futsal - 2019
 Hockey (3) - 2006, 2017, 2018
 Rowing (3) - 1985, 1995, 1996
 Soccer (5) - 2010, 2012, 2014, 2019, 2021
 Tennis - 2010
 Volleyball (3) - 2018, 2021, 2022

Girls:

 Athletics - 2006
 Basketball (8) - 1995, 1996, 1997, 1998, 1999, 2000, 2009, 2013
 Cross Country (2) - 2005, 2006
 Diving (2) - 2016, 2021
 Hockey (6) - 2000, 2011, 2012, 2017, 2018, 2021
 Netball (3) - 2004, 2005, 2021
 Rowing (4) - 2004, 2005, 2008, 2010
 Soccer (9) - 2005, 2006, 2009, 2013, 2014, 2015, 2018, 2019, 2021

Music
Carey offers students the choice of the following instrument families as part of the tuition program. These include large groups and individual lessons.

 Brass 
 Percussion 
 Orchestral string 
 Woodwind 
 Keyboard (including harpsichord) 
 Fretted strings (including guitar and mandolin) 
 Classical or Contemporary Voice (including two choirs)

Performing arts
Carey has a visiting artists program. Visiting artists in recent years have included Mark Eager, Leroy Jones and James Morrison.

Carey has an annual Senior and Middle School production where performers, musicians, technical crew and others collaborate to perform a musical.

Outdoor education 
The school has an Outdoor Education program providing camps, excursions and overnight stays. Outdoor Education is part of the Years 3 to 11 curriculum. Between Years 5 and 7, students camp at Carey Toonalook on the Banksia Peninsula in the Gippsland Lakes. In Year 10, students choose a set of various outdoor experiences. In Year 11, students have the opportunity to lead younger students in their camps.

World record attempt
On 9 September 2008, Carey student Benjamin McMahon organised a school attempt to break the Guinness world record for the largest human wheelbarrow race as part of a fundraising event, with over 1000 students participating. This attempt was successful and Carey held this record until it was broken by a school in NSW in 2009.

Uniform 

In Summer, during Term 1 and 4, students wear a summer uniform that reflects the warmer weather. In Winter, during Term 2 and 3, students wear a tie and blazer to reflect the colder weather.

From 2017, Carey's female students' uniform options broadened to include trousers and shorts in addition to skirts and dresses. This move was influenced by the School's Gender Equity Team as a way of breaking down stereotypes.

House system
The house system at Carey was introduced in 1924 with four houses. Steele was formerly called 'School House' as this was allocated for students who boarded at Carey. The current ten-house system was introduced in 1967 in both the middle and senior school. The houses are named after people who contributed to the school's founding.

Note, the table below does not include the house systems of Junior School Kew and Donvale, where they have a separate system.

Facilities

The Carey Sports Complex is located in Bulleen and set on  close to Carey's Kew and Donvale campuses. It consists of five ovals, and a gymnasium with two netball/basketball courts, which can also accommodate three volleyball or eight badminton courts. There is a weight-training facility and a 25-metre eight-lane heated swimming pool with a separate diving pool. Carey students use the facilities for physical education classes, sports training and APS matches.

In 2010, the De Young Centre for the Performing Arts was opened by the Governor of Victoria, Professor David de Kretser AC. The centre has three main sections: the school's reception foyer and gallery space; the Ian Woolf Auditorium with a 350-seat capacity and stage management facilities; and the Laycock School of Music and Drama which has rehearsal rooms, classrooms including two music technology rooms and practice and tuition studios. This building replaced what was formerly there, a boarding house called Laycock House, dating from 1925.

In 2016, the Grutzner Centre for Learning and Innovation (CLI) was opened by the Governor of Victoria, The Hon. Linda Dessau AM. The CLI contains an Information Resource Centre which has a catalogue, study spaces and laboratories. On the top of this building are the United Nations Room and a Cabinet Room, which have been used for The United Nations Youth Security Council. The CLI, designed by Hayball, was shortlisted for the Australian Interior Design Awards in 2017.

In 2022, the award winning Centre for Creativity and Collaboration was officially opened by Rev. Tim Costello AO, who was the CEO of World Vision Australia and alumni of the school. This new building updates the old Middle School Building that was originally there in different forms since the 1960s. Most of the former bulling was part of a large extension in the early 1990s. The new Middle School Building finished construction in mid 2020, however, due to the various Covid-19 lockdowns occurring in Melbourne at the time, the officiall opening had to be delayed. This building also connects with the Memorial Great Hall (MGH) and further offices and class room spaces for students between Years 7 to 9. One of the awards is the World Architecture News (WAN), Future Projects Education Award, 2018.

Notable alumni

Noah Anderson (2019) – AFL player for Gold Coast Suns
Nick Ansell (2012) – soccer player for Jeonnam Dragons, previously Melbourne Victory FC
Jason Ashby (2012) – AFL player for Essendon Football Club 
Laura Barden (2012) – hockey player for Hockeyroos
Hana Basic (2013) – Olympic sprinter
Ron Castan AM QC (1956) – Barrister and human rights advocate
Tiffany Cherry (1989) – sports broadcaster
Harriet Cordner (2011) – AFLW Footballer for Richmond Tigers, Melbourne Demons
Julie Corletto (2004) – netball player for Australian Netball Diamonds
Peter Costello (1972) – Liberal politician and former Treasurer of Australia
Tim Costello (1972) – Former CEO of World Vision Australia and former President of the Baptist Union of Australia 
Seb Costello (2004) - journalist, Nine News & Triple M
Johannah Curran (2005) – netball player for Melbourne Vixens
Nick Daicos (2020) -  AFL Footballer for Collingwood Magpies
Brian Eaton (1934) – RAAF Air Vice Marshal
John Elliott (1958) – former president of Carlton Football Club and the Liberal Party of Australia
Tom Elliott (1985) – investment banker and media personality
Hugh Evans (2001) – Young Australian of the Year 2004 and co-founder of The Oaktree Foundation
Jake Fraser-McGurk (2020) – cricketer
Andrew Gaff (2010) – AFL player for West Coast Eagles
Ellen Gandy (2010) – Olympic swimmer
Renae Hallinan (2004) – netball player for Australian Netball Diamonds
Marieke Hardy (1993) – writer, broadcaster, television producer and actress
Nathan Hrovat (2012) – AFL player for Western Bulldogs, North Melbourne Football Club
Andrew Holden (1977) – editor-in-chief of The Press and The Age
Kristian Jaksch (2012) – AFL Footballer for GWS Giants, Carlton Football Club
Daniel Jackson (2004)  – AFL player for Richmond Tigers
Murray Kellam AO QC (1964) – Officer of the Order of Australia, Supreme Court Judge and First President of VCAT
Matthew Laidlaw (2005) Former AFL Player for Sydney Swans
Meg Lanning (2009) – captain of the Australian women's national cricket team
Katie Lynch (2018) – AFLW Footballer for Collingwood Magpies/Western Bulldogs
Jack Macrae (2012) – AFL player for Western Bulldogs
Kevin McQuay (1967) – 'Big Kev', television personality and entrepreneur
Noel Mewton-Wood (1934) – pianist
Danni Miatke (2005) – swimmer
Tom Mitchell (2011) – AFL player for Hawthorn Hawks
Darcy Moore (2013) – AFL player for Collingwood Magpies
Michael Quinn (1980) – cricketer
Emma Randall (2002) – basketball player
Kim Rennie (2012) – AFLW Footballer for Western Bulldogs
Ed Richards (2017) – AFL player for Western Bulldogs
Matthew Rowell (2019) – AFL player for Gold Coast Suns
Tony Smith (1985) – Liberal Party politician and former Speaker of the Australian House of Representatives
James Tomkins (1989) – Olympic rower
Jack Viney (2012) – AFL player for Melbourne Demons
Steve Vizard (1973) – media personality and comedian
Brian Walters (1971) – barrister (QC) and human rights advocate
David Wansbrough (1982) – OAM Olympic hockey player
Suzie Wilks (1987) – television personality
Tom Wright (2001) – actor
Nicola Xenos (2019) – AFLW Footballer for St. Kilda
Graham Yallop (1971) – captain of the Australian men's national cricket team
Gary Young (1964) – founding member and drummer for Daddy Cool

Notable staff 
Frank Tyson, English Test cricketer, nicknamed "Typhoon Tyson"

See also 
 List of schools in Victoria

References

External links

Associated Public Schools of Victoria
Educational institutions established in 1923
Private secondary schools in Victoria (Australia)
Junior School Heads Association of Australia Member Schools
International Baccalaureate schools in Australia
1923 establishments in Australia
Baptist schools in Australia
Buildings and structures in the City of Boroondara
Buildings and structures in the City of Manningham